Natacha is a given name.  It may refer to:

 Natacha Amal, Belgian actress
 Natacha Atlas, Belgian Arabic pop music singer
 Natacha Peyre, a former glamour model and sex symbol
 Natacha Rambova, American costumer, Egyptologist, perfume heiress, and second wife of Rudolph Valentino
 Natacha Régnier, Belgian actress

See also
 Natasha

Russian feminine given names